Harbin University of Science and Technology is a university in Harbin, China. Previously known as Harbin University of Science and Technology. It is colloquially known as Hakeda, or Harbin Institute of Electrical Technology(). It is colloquially known as Hadiangong.

Introduction
Harbin University of Science and Technology (HrbUST) is the largest province-owned engineering university in Heilongjiang Province, located in city of Harbin.

HrbUST was founded in the early 1950s. After half a century’s development it has become a multidisciplinary university whose discipline layout is featured with electromechanical engineering as its lead as well as an integration of science and engineering, economy, management, humanities, and law.

It has four campuses: East Campus, West Campus, South Campus, and North Campus in three districts: Daoli, Nangang, and Xiangfang, covering over 1,275,000 m2, with a total building area of more than 850,000 m2, its fixed assets being ¥1.032 billion RMB. The library has a collection of 2.075 million books and about 4,900 Chinese and foreign journals and periodicals.

In 1995, three higher institutes, Harbin University of Science and Technology, Harbin Institute of Electrical Technology and Harbin Higher Industrial Vocational College, combined into the present Harbin University of Science and Technology (HUST). Founded in the 1950s, the three all once belonged to the former Ministry of Machinery. In 1998, HUST was transferred to the administration of Heilongjiang Province. In 2008, HUST became one of the 10 key universities of the province. After 60 years of development, this university has become a teaching-research university with distinctive styles and comprehensive strengths, focusing on specialties of engineering and a combination of engineering and science, with coordinated development of the following disciplines: economics, management, philosophy, literature, laws and education. In 2003, HUST was awarded by the Ministry of Education as an excellent university in undergraduate teaching evaluation. In 2011, it received the title of role model of graduates’ employment by the Ministry of Education and in 2015 it became a university jointly constructed by the province and the State Administration of Science, Technology and Industry for National Defence (SASTIND).

HUST boasts four campuses, among which the East, West and South campus are in Harbin and the Rongcheng campus is in Rongcheng, Shandong Province, covering 2,100,000 m2, with a total infrastructure area of 950,000 m2. Its library has a collection of 2.48 million books, 6,110 GB e-books, 150,000 Chinese and foreign journals and periodicals, and 31 literature databases. The total number of teaching staff is 2,960, of whom 1,690 are full-time faculty and 1,400 are associate professors or professors, one academician of Chinese Academy of Engineering, and the total number of students has reached 34,000, along with more than 100 international students.

HUST has 20 colleges, one teaching department and one training center, offering 59 bachelor degree programs and nine junior college programs, eight of which are national first-rank characteristic disciplines, three national “Outstanding Engineer Cultivation” pilot specialties; one national bachelor reform pilot specialty, 19 provincial key specialties, six provincial bachelor reform specialties, two provincial “Outstanding Engineer Cultivation” pilot specialties, six provincial bachelor degree reform pilot specialties, two provincial “Outstanding Engineer Cultivation” pilot specialties; six doctorate authorization first-rate disciplines, 21 doctorate authorization second-rate disciplines; 21 master degree authorization first-rate disciplines; 89 master degree authorization second-rate disciplines; five professional master degree authorization disciplines and 19 engineering master degree authorization specialties; seven post-doctoral research stations in the fields of Electrical Engineering, Instrument Science and Technology, Material Science and Engineering, Mechanical Engineering, Management Science and Engineering, Business Administration and Computer Science and Technology. High Voltage and Insulation Technology is a state-rate key discipline. There are 10 provincial first-rate key disciplines. HUST also has a Key Lab of the Ministry of Education and an Engineering Research Center of the Ministry of Education, 11 provincial key laboratories (engineering centers), among which the Dielectric Material Engineering Provincial Key Laboratory was rated by the Ministry of Science and Technology as a state-province jointly constructed key pilot laboratory cultivation foundation, High Efficient Cutting and Cutting Tool Technology Engineering Laboratory was rated by the National Development and Reform Commission asa state-province joint engineering laboratory, theAdvanced Electrical Equipment Manufacturing and Intelligent Operation Collaborative Innovation Center was rated as one of the first provincial “Collaborative Innovation Centers of 2011”; six provincial college key labs, four provincial college-enterprise cooperation engineering research center and one Architecture Design Institute with class-A aptitude; one national university science park, two national experimental teaching demonstration centers, six national engineering practice centers, two national off-campus practice bases, one national high-quality resource-sharing course, two national high-quality video courses.

Since the 12th Five-Year Plan, HUST has undertaken 171 state projects, including “973 Programs”, “863 Programs” and State Natural Science Foundation projects, 283 provincial projects and 1,130 enterprise-commissioned projects. For the technological achievements, HUST has won 137 awards, among which 81 were of provincial level. The teaching and research staff have published more than 4,600 academic papers, 3,200 of which have been collected into the three major retrieval systems. In teaching research, HUST has won nine first-rate and 17 second-rate provincial teaching achievement awards, five first-rate, 15 second-rate, and 12 third-rate provincial teaching and research achievement awards, undertaking 166 provincial teaching and research programs. 4,114 students have taken part in various competitions: international level, 73; national level, 1,065, and provincial level, 2976, undertaking 102 national students’ innovative programs, 78 provincial students’ innovative programs.

HUST publishes four journals: Electric Machines and Control, Journal of Harbin University of Science and Technology, Science-Technology and Management, and Research of Ideological and Political Education, among whichElectric Machines and Controlis collected into EI Compendex (core) database, a state key journal, a CSCD cited journal, and an excellent sci-tech journal in China. TheJournal of Harbin University of Science and Technologyis a state key academic journal, one of the “China Excellent Sci-tech Journals”. Science-Technology and Managementis a RCCSE core academic journal, a China college sci-tech academic journal with characteristics(2011-2012).Research of Ideological and Political Educationis a CSSCI journal (2014-2015), a China humanities core journal, an RCCSE authoritative academic journal, and one of the “100 Excellent College Hunaities Journals”.

With the guideline of coordinating internal and external resources, HUST actively promotes international cooperation and academic exchanges. So far it has established a long-term cooperation with more than 50 universities or research institutes in more than 20 countries in Europe, America and the Asian-Pacific region, actively engaged in students’ joint cultivating and training, teachers’ academic changes and cooperation and sci-tech research, and upgrading the university’s school-running ability and comprehensive strengths.

With more than 60 years of development, HUST has cultivated tens of thousands of talents for manufacturing industry, and many graduates have become backbones in technical field or leaders in large or medium enterprises. The university is renowned as the “Cradle of Engineers”, the “West Point” in the wire and cable industry. Facing the future, HUST will “stabilize school size, improve school-running capability, highlight school characteristics, and consolidate the basis for a high-level teaching-research university” so that it will be recognized and accepted by the society and in which teachers, students, and alumni will take pride.

To conform to national economy and social development and to take the advantage of talents, HrbUST has set up 45 research institutes guided by the strategy of emphasizing subject development, teaching and research. From 1996 to now, the university has undertaken over 1,951 state and provincial projects with 900 research results (183 winning prizes). The university has published more than 5,770 academic papers, 386 books in special subjects. Insisting on opening to the outside, seizing the opportunity of reforming old industrial bases in the Northeast China, and following the course of manufacturing, learning and researching, HrbUST has set up bases of research result cultivation to transform the results into productive forces and cooperate with local governments.

Exchange and cooperation

HrbUST has established long-term friendly cooperation with many universities or research institutes in more than 10 countries. HrbUST has jointly run schools with the following foreign universities: Troy State University (US), Oriental New Mexican University, Pittsburgh University, City University London (UK), Novosibirsk State Technical University (Russia), La Trobe University, Edith Cowan University (Australia), Chubu University (Japan), Capilano College (Canada), Université Laval (Canada), European University Cyprus (Cyprus), etc.

Faculties
School of Mechanical and Power Engineering
School of Material Science and Engineering
School of Electrical and Electronic Engineering
School of Computer Science and Technology
School of Measurement-Control Tech and Communications Engineering
School of Economic Management
School of Applied Sciences
School of Art Design
School of Software
School of Chemistry and Environmental Engineering
School of International Cultural Education
School of Architecture and Civil Engineering
School of Automation
School of Laws
Foreign Language Institute
School of Continual Education
Postgraduate Training Division
Physical Training Dept
Military Training and Teaching Dept
Foreign Language Teaching Dept
Marxism–Leninism Teaching and Research Dept
Modern Education and Technology Center
Engineering Training Center
Campus Network Information Center
Computer Center

External links
Harbin University of Science and Technology (HrbUST) 
哈尔滨理工大学官网 
Official website of Hrbust 

Universities and colleges in Heilongjiang
Universities and colleges in Harbin
Technical universities and colleges in China
Educational institutions established in 1950
1950 establishments in China